Ahihud railway station is a railway station in Ahihud, Israel. It is operated by Israel Railways and is located of the Karmiel line between Kiryat Motzkin and Karmiel. The station (as well as the whole Karmiel line) was opened on 20 September 2017.

References

Railway stations in Northern District (Israel)
Railway stations opened in 2017
2017 establishments in Israel